Dohrn may refer to:

People
Anton Dohrn (1840-1909), German biologist and Darwinist
Bernardine Dohrn (born 1942), American political radical
Carl August Dohrn (1806-1892), German entomologist
Georg Dohrn (1867–1942), German conductor and pianist
Heinrich Wolfgang Ludwig Dohrn (1838-1913), German entomologist 
Walt Dohrn (born 1970), American voice actor, screenwriter, animator, television director, and comedian

Ships
FRV Anton Dohrn, German Fisheries Research Vessel launched 1954 active into 1980s.
Anton Dohrn, University of Southern California, Venice Marine Biological Station vessel active in scientific work on the California coast.
, American motor yacht used in scientific work

See also
Anton Dohrn Seamount
Dohrn's thrush-babbler (Horizorhinus dohrni), a bird endemic to São Tomé and Príncipe